Hartwig is a Germanic-language surname, literally meaning hard in battle (wikt:hart + wikt:wig).

Finnish variants of the name, derived from the North German form Harteke, include Hartik (archaic), Hartikka, Harto, Hartto, Harttu, Hartus, Harttula, Hartikkala, Hartoinen, Hartuinen and most often, Hartikainen, a Savonian noble variant. 

Notable people with the surname include:
Carter Hartwig (b. 1956), American professional football player
Clayton Hartwig (1964–1989), American sailor accused of causing the 1989 explosion of the 16" gun turret on the USS Iowa
Edward Hartwig (1909–2003), Polish photographer
Ernst Hartwig (1851–1923), German astronomer
Eva Brigitta Hartwig, later Vera Zorina, German prima ballerina active in America
Gay Hartwig (contemporary), American voice actress
Ina Hartwig (b. 1963), German author, journalist, culture politician 
Heike Hartwig (b. 1962), German Olympic shot putter
Jeff Hartwig (b. 1967), American Olympic polevaulter
Jimmy Hartwig (b. 1954), German professional football player
John F. Hartwig (b. 1964), Henry Rapoport Professor of Chemistry at the University of California, Berkeley
Josef Hartwig (1880–1956), German sculptor, Bauhaus teacher, and designer of an iconic chess set
Julia Hartwig (1921–2017), Polish poet and translator
Justin Hartwig (b. 1978), American professional football player
Marie Hartwig (1906–2001), American professor of physical education and advocate of women's sports
Nicholas Hartwig (1857–1914), Russian diplomat; ambassador to Persia 1906–08 and to Serbia 1904–14
Rex Hartwig (b. 1929), Australian professional tennis player
Roland Hartwig (b. 1954), German politician
Wolf C. Hartwig (1921–2017), German film producer

See also
 
Hartwich

References

German-language surnames
Surnames from given names